American girl group The Supremes have released 29 studio albums, four live albums, two soundtrack albums, 32 compilation albums, four box sets, 66 singles and three promotional singles. The Supremes are the most successful American group of all-time, and the 26th greatest artist of all time on the US Billboard charts; with 12 number-one songs on the Billboard Hot 100 (the fifth-best total in the chart's history) and three number-one albums on the Billboard 200. The  Supremes were the first artist to accumulate five consecutive number-one singles on the US Hot 100 and the first female group to top the Billboard 200 albums chart with The Supremes A' Go-Go (1966). In 2017, Billboard ranked The Supremes as the number-one girl group of all-time, publishing, 'although there have been many girl group smashes in the decades since the Supremes ruled the Billboard charts, no collective has yet to challenge their, for lack of a better word, supremacy.' In 2019, the Official Charts Company placed 7 Supremes songs—"You Can't Hurry Love" (16), "Baby Love" (23), "Stop! In The Name Of Love" (56), "Where Did Our Love Go?" (59), "You Keep Me Hangin' On" (78), "Come See About Me" (94) and "Stoned Love" (99)—on The Official Top 100 Motown songs of the Millennium chart, which ranks Motown releases by their all-time UK downloads and streams.

In 2020, Insider.com named The Supremes "the best-selling vocal group to date", after Ebony estimated The Supremes' record sales at 50 million in 1980 and Euronews reported total sales exceeding 100 million records in 2014. This would make the group one of the best-selling music artists of all time. However, Motown refused to submit their books for industry audit, until the 1980s, years after the group disbanded. As such, The Supremes' first certifications include; the Anthology compilation album, which peaked at number 66 on the US Billboard 200 and was certified Gold by the Recording Industry Association of America (RIAA) on January 21, 1986; and the Love Supreme (1988) compilation, which peaked at number ten on the UK Albums Chart and was certified Silver by the British Phonographic Industry (BPI) on January 27, 1989. To put this into perspective, the group's first hits compilation, Greatest Hits (1967), topped both the US and UK albums charts upon release. Despite selling over one million copies in the US, with 89 total weeks on the Billboard 200; and being the UK's fourth "longest-reigning Top 40 girl group album ever", with a total of 60 weeks in the top 40; Greatest Hits (1967) is not certified by either the RIAA or BPI.

Overview

The Supremes (1960–1967)
After several non-charting releases, The Supremes made their first appearance on the US Hot 100 in August, 1962 with "Your Heart Belongs to Me". They released their debut album, Meet The Supremes (1962), featuring the singles, "I Want a Guy", "Buttered Popcorn" (led by Florence Ballard), "Your Heart Belongs to Me" and "Let Me Go the Right Way"; the latter being their first appearance on the US Hot R&B/Hip-Hop Songs chart (then titled Hot R&B Singles). Though Meet The Supremes failed to chart in the US, in 1964, it was released with an alternate tracklisting in the UK, featuring the title-track to their next album, "Where Did Our Love Go", which peaked at number three in the UK. The UK release of Meet The Supremes peaked at number thirteen, becoming the first charting LP for Motown in the UK.

The Supremes' second studio album Where Did Our Love Go (1964), featured their first three consecutive number-ones and million-sellers in the US; "Where Did Our Love Go", "Baby Love" and "Come See About Me"; as well as their first top 40 and international hit, "When the Lovelight Starts Shining Through His Eyes". "Where Did Our Love Go" sold over 2 million copies in the US alone, where it is ranked number 586 on the Billboard all-time chart, where "Baby Love" is number 559. "Where Did Our Love Go" also hit number-one in Canada and New Zealand; whilst "Baby Love" topped the charts in the UK, New Zealand and Singapore, and was nominated at the 7th Annual Grammy Awards for Best Rhythm & Blues Recording. The album, Where Did Our Love Go topped the US Top R&B/Hip-Hop Albums chart (then titled Hot R&B LPs), and hit number two on the Billboard 200, where it spent a total of 89 weeks.

This was followed by the themed albums, A Bit of Liverpool (1964), The Supremes Sing Country, Western and Pop (1965) and We Remember Sam Cooke (1965), which charted at numbers 21, 79 and 75 in the US, respectively. Their sixth studio album, More Hits by The Supremes, hit number six on the Billboard 200 and two on the R&B Albums chart. It contained their fourth and fifth consecutive US number-ones and million-sellers; "Stop! In the Name of Love", nominated at the 8th Annual Grammy Awards for Best Contemporary (R&R) Performance – Group (Vocal or Instrumental); and "Back in My Arms Again" which also hit number one in Canada. Last single, "Nothing but Heartaches", was their sixth consecutive million-selling single in the US, notable for breaking their chain of number-ones when it peaked at number eleven. Their first live album, The Supremes at the Copa (1965) was released alongside their seventh studio album, Merry Christmas (1965); which produced the singles "Twinkle, Twinkle, Little Me", "My Favorite Things" and "Santa Claus Is Coming to Town", which hit number one in Singapore and number two in Malaysia.

The Supremes' eighth studio album, I Hear a Symphony (1966), was their second number-one album on the Billboard R&B chart. It features their seventh and eighth consecutive US million-sellers; the title track, which hit number one in the US and Canada, and US top 5, "My World Is Empty Without You", which also topped the Canadian singles chart. The Supremes A' Go-Go (1966), their ninth studio album, 'made chart history' as 'the first album in the rock era by a girl group' to hit number-one in the US. It contains the US top 10 "Love Is Like an Itching in My Heart" and their ninth US million-seller and seventh number one, "You Can't Hurry Love". Their tenth studio album, The Supremes Sing Holland–Dozier–Holland (1967), was their third Billboard R&B number one; featuring their tenth and eleventh US million-sellers; "You Keep Me Hangin' On" and "Love Is Here and Now You're Gone", which both topped the US Hot 100. Included on the Greatest Hits (1967) compilation, their twelfth million-selling single in the US, "The Happening", also topped the US Hot 100, becoming their tenth US number-one between 1964 and 1967.

Diana Ross & the Supremes (1967–1970)
As Diana Ross & the Supremes, they released two further singles featuring vocals by founding member Florence Ballard; their 13th US million-seller "Reflections" and US top 10 "In and Out of Love". Their twelfth studio album, Reflections (1968), contains both singles and was the first to feature Cindy Birdsong in Ballard's place. Their fourteenth studio album, Diana Ross & the Supremes Join the Temptations, was their first UK number-one album. It featured the hit single, "I'm Gonna Make You Love Me", which sold 900,000 copies in its first two weeks of release and was certified Platinum by the RIAA on August 7, 1997. This was shortly followed by their eleventh US number-one single "Love Child", which sold 500,000 in its first week and 2 million copies by the end of 1968 in the US alone. Also a number-one hit in Canada in New Zealand, "Love Child" was the title track of their 1968 album. Their second live album, Live at London's Talk of the Town (1968), was their first live release to chart in the UK. Their first soundtrack album, TCB (1968), became their third release to top both the US Billboard 200 and R&B Albums charts.

Their sixteenth studio album, Let the Sunshine In (1969), produced three top 40 singles, including the top 10, "I'm Livin' in Shame". Together, their seventeenth studio album and second with The Temptations, produced the lone single "The Weight", which became the group's lowest-charting single since 1964's "Run, Run, Run". The group's eighteenth studio album, Cream of the Crop, was the last released with Diana Ross. It contains their last US number-one, "Someday We'll Be Together", which sold 2 million in the US and 3 million worldwide. The single was certified Platinum by the RIAA on August 7, 1997.

The Supremes (1970–1977)
As The Supremes, with Jean Terrell as lead singer, their nineteenth studio album, Right On (1970), was released. It features "Up the Ladder to the Roof", which hit the top 10 in Canada, Iceland, the UK and the US, where it became The Supremes' seventeenth million-selling single. The Magnificent 7 (1970), their first collaborative studio album with the Four Tops, is one of The Supremes' highest-charting album releases in the UK, where it peaked at number six. The Magnificent 7, featured their cover of Ike & Tina Turner's, "River Deep, Mountain High", which became the most successful US release of the song, peaking at number fourteen on the Hot 100 and number seven on the R&B chart.

Their twenty-first studio album, New Ways but Love Stays (1970), features "Stoned Love", which became the group's last number-one on the US Billboard R&B singles chart and last top 10 on the Hot 100. Internationally, "Stoned Love" hit the top 10 in Canada, Iceland and Singapore; and was The Supremes' highest charting UK single since "I'm Gonna Make You Love Me" (with The Temptations) in 1968 and "You Can't Hurry Love" in 1966, which like "Stoned Love", peaked at number 3. Touch (1971), is the twenty-third studio album by The Supremes and their last non-compilation album to chart in the UK top 40. Touch includes the single, "Nathan Jones", which hit the UK top 5, as well as the top 20 in Canada and the US, where it became the group's third million-selling single with Jean Terrell. Floy Joy (1972), their twenty-fifth studio album, contains the US top 40 singles, "Floy Joy" and "Automatically Sunshine", which both reached the UK top 10. "Floy Joy" was the fourth million-selling Supremes single in the US with Terrell, and twentieth million-selling single by the group overall.  In 1973, the Stevie Wonder-produced "Bad Weather", featuring Cindy Birdsong replacement Lynda Laurence, was the group's last single to reach the UK top 40. In the US, "Bad Weather" was the group's lowest-charting single since "Run, Run, Run" in 1964.

Following this, Jean Terrell and Lynda Laurence left and were replaced by former Glass House member and new lead singer, Scherrie Payne and former Supreme Cindy Birdsong. After a two-year hiatus, with original member Mary Wilson, they released their twenty-seventh studio album The Supremes (1975). High Energy (1976), their twenty-eighth studio album, featured the group's last US top 40 hit, "I'm Gonna Let My Heart Do the Walking", which features additional vocals by Susaye Greene, who replaced Birdsong during the album's recording. Of The Supremes' 1970s albums, High Energy, is the second-highest charting after Right On (1970), whilst in Canada, High Energy is the highest-charting Supremes album since TCB (1968). Mary, Scherrie & Susaye (1976) is the twenty-ninth and final studio album by The Supremes, featuring their last single to hit the US Hot 100, "You're My Driving Wheel"; plus the singles "Let Yourself Go" and "Love, I Never Knew You Could Feel So Good", which all reached number five on the US Dance Club Songs chart.

Albums

Studio albums

Live albums

Soundtrack albums

Compilation albums

Remix albums

Box sets

Extended plays

Singles

1960s

1970s

1990s

2000s

2020s

As backing vocalists

Promotional singles

Re-issued singles

Other appearances

Album appearances

As featured artist

Other albums

Videography

Video albums

See also
Diana Ross discography

Notes
Charts and sales

Further information

References

External links

Discography
Discographies of American artists
Supremes, The
Soul music discographies